Jiiddu (also known as Jiddu or Af-Jiiddu) is an Afro-Asiatic language spoken by the Jiiddu sub-clan of the Dir, a Somali clan inhabiting southern Somalia. It is part of the family's Cushitic branch, and has an estimated 100,000 speakers mainly residing in the Lower Shabeelle, Bay and Middle Jubba regions.

Typically classified as part of the Digil group of languages, Jiiddu has a different phonology and sentence structure from Somali. However, it more closely resembles Somali than Baiso. It also possibly shares commonalities with the Hadiyya, Gedeo, Alaba-Kabeena, Konso and Kambaata languages spoken in southern Ethiopia.

There is a dictionary of Jiddu by a native speaker, Dr. Salim Ibro.

Notes

East Cushitic languages
Languages of Somalia